RoseAnne Archibald is a Canadian First Nations advocate and politician who is the current National Chief of the Assembly of First Nations (AFN) since July 8, 2021 . She is the first female National Chief of the Assembly of First Nations.

Archibald was first elected as the chief of the Taykwa Tagamou Nation in 1990, being the first woman and the youngest chief to be elected, at the age of 23. She was the first woman and youngest Nishnawbe Aski Nation Deputy Grand Chief in 1991, and the first woman and youngest Grand Chief of the Mushkegowuk Council in 1994. She became the first woman elected as Ontario Regional Chief in 2018. During this tenure, Archibald was the subject of an independent probe after AFN staff accused her of bullying and harassment. While the AFN deemed the allegations credible, Archibald maintains the probe was reprisal. In 2021, Archibald won the National Chief of the Assembly of First Nations election on the second day of voting, after Reginald Bellerose, who was in second place, conceded. 

Archibald was suspended as National Chief on June 17, 2022 over bullying and harassment allegations. The suspension came after she released a statement labelling the allegations a "smear campaign" and calling for an investigation into the AFN's conduct. She was reinstated on July 5, 2022, after a resolution to uphold her suspension was defeated at the AFN General Assembly.

Awards and recognition 
 Toronto Star 20 Ontario Vaccine Heroes
 Maclean's Magazine Power List: 50 Canadians shaping how we think and live
 The Hill Times 100 most influential people to watch in federal politics

References 

Living people
20th-century First Nations people
21st-century First Nations people
Assembly of First Nations chiefs
First Nations activists
Indigenous leaders in Ontario
First Nations women in politics
Year of birth missing (living people)